Mala Plaža (lit. "Small Beach") also called City Beach is a beach in Ulcinj Municipality, Montenegro.

It is located between Ulcinj Castle and Jadran Peninsula. It is the main city beach.

Overview
The length of the beach is 376 meters and the surface is 12.787 m2. It can host over 2,500 vacationers.

References

Beaches of Montenegro